Adams State University is a public university in Alamosa, Colorado. The university's Adams State Grizzlies athletic teams compete in the Rocky Mountain Athletic Conference.

History
Adams State was founded in 1921 as a teacher's college. Billy Adams, a Colorado legislator who would later become a three-term governor of Colorado, worked for three decades before obtaining the authorization to found Adams State Normal School in 1921, to provide higher education opportunities for teachers from remote and rural areas of Colorado, such as the San Luis Valley, and see them work in those same areas. In 1926, Harriet Dalzell Hester became the university's first graduate. She became the school's first librarian and an Alamosa County school superintendent. The school adopted the name Adams State College in 1946, corresponding with the expansion of its undergraduate and graduate programs.

In 2012, the institution's name changed again, to Adams State University.

The university gained some national attention in 2016 when its online classes came under scrutiny. The university's regional accreditor, the Higher Learning Commission, placed the university on probation. In 2018, the probation was lifted and the university's status was restored to "Accredited."

The university also came into the national spotlight when it placed president Beverlee McClure on leave after employees lodged complaints about her "caustic behavior." Dr. Cheryl D. Lovell, Ph.D., was named the interim president and appointed to serve a 12-month term beginning July 1, 2018.

Presidents
Presidents have been:
 Ira Richardson (1925–1950)
 William Newson (1950–1952)
 Fred J. Plachy (1952–1966)
 John A. Marvel (1966–1977)
 Milton Byrd (1978–1980)
 Marv Motz (interim, 1980)
 William M. Fulkerson, Jr. (1981–1993)
 Marv Motz (interim, 1993–1994)
 J. Thomas Gilmore (1995–2002)
 Lee Halgren (interim, 2002–2004)
 Richard A. Wueste (2004–2005)
 David Svaldi (2005–2015)
 Beverlee J. McClure (2015–2018)
 Matt Nehring (interim, Spring 2018)
 Cheryl D. Lovell (2018–2022)
 Kent Buchanan (acting, June 2022)
 David A. Tandberg (interim, as of July 1, 2022)

Academics 
Adams State offers bachelor's degrees in 16 different academic programs, with nearly 60 emphases, five teacher licensure programs, and ten pre-professional programs, in addition to seven master's degrees and one doctoral degree. Students can also earn an associate of art or science degree at Adams State.

Campus
Adams State University's campus is located in the heart of the San Luis Valley. All of the university's academic and residential buildings are located on its contiguous  campus.

Academic buildings
The main administration building and oldest building on campus is Richardson Hall, named after the school's first president, Dr. Ira Richardson. The home of the math and science curriculum, Porter Hall, is named for alumnus William A. Porter, the creator of E-Trade and a major benefactor of the school. McDaniel Hall, named for donor and emeritus faculty member Dr. John McDaniel, is the main venue for English, psychology, history, sociology, and teacher education classes.

Campus edifices for the performing arts include the Adams State University Theater (erected in 2001), the Music Building (which underwent major renovations in 2011) and the Leon Memorial Concert Hall.

Athletic facilities
There are two gyms and an indoor pool. The Rex Activity Center for student recreation includes weights, exercise bikes, rock climbing wall, and racquet ball courts. Plachy Hall includes the gym and indoor pool and field house as part of the Athletics Department.

The Rex Stadium has undergone major renovation including the addition of the Residence at the Rex. The new complex includes suites for game viewing.  The new residence hall provides one of the most impressive views, with a view of Mount Blanca (one of the 14ers of Colorado) to the east and overlooking the track and football field to the west.  A new $750,000 video-tron screen displays action and replays at one end of the field.

Residences
There are currently six on-campus apartment complexes (Houtchens, McCurry, Moffat, Petteys, Savage and Residence at the Rex) that include private bedrooms for two to three students, a kitchen/living room and private bath, in addition to three traditional dormitory halls (Conour, Coronado and Girault).  Most entering freshmen are housed in Coronado and Girault Halls. The main cafeteria, La Mesa Dining Hall, in the Student Union Building is newly renovated.

Athletics

NCAA 
The Adams State Grizzlies compete in the Rocky Mountain Athletic Conference (RMAC) at the NCAA Division II level. Grizzly teams compete in men's baseball, basketball, cross country, football, lacrosse, soccer, swimming, track and field, and wrestling; and women's  basketball, cross country, golf, lacrosse, soccer, softball, swimming, track and field, and volleyball.

The Grizzlies have won 222 RMAC team championships and 64 team National Championships. Individually, Adams State has produced 268 national champions and 1,937 All-Americans.

The school's sports teams are now called the Grizzlies and were formerly known as the Indians.

Notable alumni
David E. Clemmer, named to the Popular Science "10 Most Brilliant List" in 2002
Don Cockroft,  former American football punter and placekicker for the Cleveland Browns
Gary W. Gallagher, historian of U.  S. Civil War, professor at University of Virginia
Carlos Lucero, federal judge on the United States Court of Appeals for the Tenth Circuit
Neal Nelson, Hall of Fame Basketball Coach
Chris Perry, former professional football player
Pat Porter, two-time Olympian runner
William A. Porter, co-founder of E-Trade
Shakir Smith, professional basketball player
Bill Stone, former football running back for the Chicago Bruisers (arena football)
Myron Thompson, Member of Parliament (1993-2008) in the Canadian House of Commons
Donald Valdez, Colorado State Representative representing Colorado's 62nd district
Joe Vigil, PhD, track and field coach; Olympic long-distance running coach (1998)
Travante Williams, professional basketball player

References

External links

 
Liberal arts colleges in Colorado
Public universities and colleges in Colorado
Buildings and structures in Alamosa, Colorado
Education in Alamosa County, Colorado
Educational institutions established in 1921
1921 establishments in Colorado
Universities and colleges accredited by the Higher Learning Commission